"Goodnight Song" is a song by the British band Tears for Fears.

Taken from their 1993 album Elemental, it was released as a single in North America and in some European countries (though not in the UK), and was a minor hit in Canada.

The US single included the b-side "New Star". This song was played during the opening credits of the 1994 film Threesome and appears on the film's soundtrack album. It was also later included on the 1996 Tears for Fears compilation album Saturnine Martial & Lunatic.

Track listing

US track listing 

 "Goodnight Song" – 3:53
 "New Star" (Roland Orzabal, Alan Griffiths) - 4:29

French 2-track CD 

 "Goodnight Song" – 3:53
 "Elemental (Sons of August Mix)" (Roland Orzabal, Alan Griffiths) - 5:29

Video 
The music video was directed by Dani Jacobs and shows Orzabal and the rest of the group performing in a bar. It also shows brief video fragments of other things including scenes from a boardwalk and a picture of a toothbrush.  The overall theme visually was that of a 1990s American southwest.

Chart positions 

1 - Equaling #125 on the main U.S. Billboard Hot 100.

1993 singles
Tears for Fears songs
Songs written by Roland Orzabal
1992 songs
Mercury Records singles